White Oak is an unincorporated community in Fayette County, in the U.S. state of Ohio.

History
A post office called White Oak was established in 1857, and remained in operation until 1864. White Oak once had its own schoolhouse.

References

Unincorporated communities in Fayette County, Ohio
1857 establishments in Ohio
Populated places established in 1857
Unincorporated communities in Ohio